Consignment is the fifth mixtape released by rap artist Jadakiss. It was released on April 27, 2012. The mixtape has been downloaded over 1 million times on DatPiff, certifying it double platinum.  The mixtape features guest appearances from Wale, French Montana, Styles P, Meek Mill, Yung Joc, Fabolous, Lloyd Banks, Young Jeezy, Yo Gotti, Ace Hood, Waka Flocka Flame, Slim Dunkin, 2 Chainz, Emanny, Cito, Goldie, Swerv, Future, Gucci Mane, Sheek Louch and Trae Tha Truth.

Background
On April 1, 2012, Jadakiss announced his fifth mixtape Consignment.

Critical reception 
Consignment was met with generally mixed reviews from music critics. Jesse Fairfax of HipHopDX said "Overall, much of Consignment reflects the watered down state of a scene where artificial team ups are designed to tackle the risk of dedicated fandom not being enough for East Coast emcees to stay afloat. As Jadakiss readies Top 5 Dead Or Alive, he should keep in mind his natural ability to stand out from the bunch, as accessories aren't always necessary." Ralph Bristout of XXL gave the mixtape an L, criticizing the excessive number of features; while praising the lyrics, he took issue with the beats as "consistently [not] up to par" with Jadakiss's rapping.

Track listing

References

2012 mixtape albums
Jadakiss albums
DJ Drama albums
Albums produced by Jahlil Beats
Albums produced by AraabMuzik